Asperula apuana is a deciduous species of perennial groundcover, and a flowering plant in the family Rubiaceae, known as Woodruff, and is endemic to Italy, and was first named by (Fiori) Arrigoni.

Description
Asperula apuana appears as a long green heather-like plant, with small (1in) white flowers, on long, rough, woody stems, it has compact small, green, needle-like, leaves.

Growth cycle
Asperula apuana flowers around May-June, and grows best in a rock garden, trough or crevice.

References

apuana
Flora of Italy